Herron is a Scottish surname and a given name. Notable people with the name include:

Surname
 Andrew S. Herron (1823-1882), American politician
 Andy Herron, Costa Rican football player
 Bob Herron (1924–2021), American stuntman and actor
 Camille Herron, marathoner and ultrarunner
 Carolivia Herron, American writer of children's and adult literature
 Catherine Herron (born 1983), Canadian ice hockey player and coach
 Charles Lee Herron (born 1937), American former fugitive
 Cindy Herron, singer with En Vogue
 Denis Herron, Canadian professional ice hockey goaltender
 Francis J. Herron, Union general during the American Civil War
 George D. Herron (1862-1925), American clergyman, lecturer, writer, and Christian socialist activist
 Helen Herron Taft (maiden name: Herron), First Lady of the United States from 1909 to 1913
 John Herron (Pittsburgh)
 John S. Herron, Mayor of Pittsburgh in the 1930s 
 John Herron (Alberta politician), Canadian Member of Parliament from Alberta in the early 1900s 
 John Herron (New Brunswick politician), Canadian Member of Parliament from New Brunswick in the 1990s 
 John Herron (Australian politician), Australian Senator
 Leslie Herron, Australian barrister, judge, chief justice and lieutenant governor of New South Wales 
 Lucy Herron, founding trustee of the charity Msizi Africa 
 Mark Herron, actor and fourth husband of Judy Garland
 Mick Herron, British novelist
 Roy Herron, Tennessee State Senator
 Tim Herron, American golfer
 Tom Herron, Grand Prix motorcycle road racer
 Tyler Herron (born 1986), American baseball player
 William Blake Herron, screenwriter, director and actor
 Zach Herron, member of the man band Why Don't We

Second surname
 James Herron Hopkins, Member of the U.S. House of Representatives from Pennsylvania

Given name
 Herron C. Pearson, Member of the U.S. House of Representatives from Tennessee
 Herron Berrian, Liberian soccer player

See also

 Edward O'Herron Jr., American businessman & politician

 Herron (disambiguation)
 Herronen (surname)
 Harron (surname)